The 1925 Cork Senior Football Championship was the 37th staging of the Cork Senior Football Championship since its establishment by the Cork County Board in 1887.

Nils were the defending champions.

On 18 October 1925, Nils won the championship following a 4-03 to 0-02 defeat of Macroom in the final at the Mardyke. This was their sixth championship title overall and their second title in succession. It remains their last championship title.

Results

Final

Championship statistics

Miscellaneous
 Nils win their sixth and final title.

References

Cork Senior Football Championship